The Olof Palme Prize is an annual Swedish prize awarded for an outstanding achievement in the spirit of Olof Palme. The Prize consists of a diploma and 100,000 US dollars.

The prize was established in February 1987 and is awarded by the Olof Palme Memorial Fund for International Understanding and Common Security, a fund that was established by Olof Palme's family and the Swedish Social Democratic Party in honor of Olof Palme's memory.

Recipients 

1987 Cyril Ramaphosa
1988 UNs Peace Keeping Operation under the leadership of Javier Pérez de Cuéllar 
1989 Václav Havel 
1990 Harlem Désir and SOS Racisme
1991 Amnesty International
1992 Arzu Abdullayeva and Anahit Bayandour
1993 Students for Sarajevo
1994 Wei Jingsheng
1995 Fatah Youth, Labour Young Leadership and Peace Now
1996 Casa Alianza under the leadership of Bruce Harris
1997 Salima Ghezali
1998 Independent media in the former Yugoslavia represented by Veran Matić of B92 radio (Serbia), Senad Pećanin of Dani weekly (Bosnia-Herzegovina) and Viktor Ivančić of Feral Tribune weekly (Croatia).
1999 Swedish anti-racists: Kurdo Baksi, Björn Fries and the Parent Group in Klippan, representing the popular mobilization against growing racism and xenophobia in the country.
2000 Bryan Stevenson
2001 Fazle Hasan Abed and girls' education
2002 Hanan Ashrawi
2003 Hans Blix
2004 Lyudmila Alexeyeva, Sergey Kovalyov, Anna Politkovskaya 
2005 Aung San Suu Kyi
2006 Kofi Annan, Mossaad Mohamed Ali
2007 Parvin Ardalan
2008 Denis Mukwege
2009 Carsten Jensen
2010 Eyad al-Sarraj
2011 Lydia Cacho, Roberto Saviano
2012 Radhia Nasraoui, Waleed Sami Abu AlKhair
2013 Rosa Taikon
2014 Xu Youyu
2015 Gideon Levy, Mitri Raheb
2016 Spyridon Galinos, Giusi Nicolini
2017 Hédi Fried, Emerich Roth
2018 Daniel Ellsberg
2019 John le Carré
2020 Black Lives Matter Global Network Foundation
2022 Patricia Gualinga

See also
List of peace activists

References

External links
 Olof Palme Foundation
 All winners

Humanitarian and service awards
Peace awards
Prize

Human rights awards
Awards established in 1987